"Turn On (The Beat Box)" is a song by American band Earth, Wind & Fire, released in 1988 by Columbia Records as a single from their second greatest hits compilation, The Best of Earth, Wind & Fire, Vol. 2 (1988). It rose to No. 26 on the US Billboard Hot Soul Singles chart and No. 30 on the Dutch Pop Singles chart. It was written by Maurice White, Rhett Lawrence and Martin Page, and was also heard in the soundtrack of the feature film Caddyshack II (1988).

Critical reception
Billboard called the song "a light, pop inflected chugger".

Charts

References

Earth, Wind & Fire songs
Songs written by Rhett Lawrence
Songs written by Maurice White
Songs written by Martin Page
1988 singles
1988 songs
Columbia Records singles
Song recordings produced by Rhett Lawrence